121 may refer to:

121 (number), a natural number
AD 121, a year in the 2nd century AD
121 BC, a year in the 2nd century BC

121 (Eagle) Sqn
121 (MBTA bus)
121 (New Jersey bus)
Road 121, see list of highways numbered 121
Russian cruiser Moskva (pennant number: 121)
"121", a song by Robert Forster from the album Calling from a Country Phone

See also

12/1 (disambiguation)
 Unbiunium, a hypothetical chemical element with atomic number 121